Mimetus notius is a species of pirate spiders in the family Mimetidae. It is found in the USA.

References

 Bradley, Richard A. (2012). Common Spiders of North America. University of California Press.
 Ubick, Darrell (2005). Spiders of North America: An Identification Manual. American Arachnological Society.

External links

 NCBI Taxonomy Browser, Mimetus notius

Mimetidae
Spiders described in 1923